Aquaporin-6, (AQP-6) also known as kidney-specific aquaporin is a protein in humans that is encoded by the AQP6 gene.

The protein encoded by this gene is an aquaporin protein, which functions as a water channel in cells. Aquaporins are a family of small integral membrane proteins related to the major intrinsic protein (MIP or AQP0). This protein is specific for the kidney. This gene and related family members AQP0, AQP2, and AQP5 reside in a cluster on chromosome 12q13.

References

External links

Further reading